Clinton is a census-designated place in Findlay Township, Allegheny County, Pennsylvania, United States. It had a population of 905 at the 2020 census. The community is located adjacent to the Pittsburgh International Airport within the Pittsburgh metropolitan area.

History
In mid-2014 the Pittsburgh Post-Gazette opened a large printing plant in Clinton.

Demographics

Education
Children in Clinton are served by the West Allegheny School District. The current schools serving the community are:
 Wilson Elementary School – grades K-5
 West Allegheny Middle School – grades 6-8
 West Allegheny Senior High School – grades 9-12

References

Census-designated places in Allegheny County, Pennsylvania
Census-designated places in Pennsylvania
Unincorporated communities in Allegheny County, Pennsylvania
Unincorporated communities in Pennsylvania